Letteri is an Italian surname. Notable people with the surname include:

Guglielmo Letteri (1926–2006), Italian comics artist
Joe Letteri (born 1957), American visual effects artist

Italian-language surnames